The 1961 American Football League season was the second regular season of the AFL. It consisted of 8 franchises split into two divisions: the East Division (Buffalo Bills, Houston Oilers, Titans of New York, Boston Patriots) and the West Division (San Diego Chargers, Denver Broncos, Dallas Texans, Oakland Raiders).

After having spent its inaugural season in Los Angeles, the Chargers moved to San Diego, California for this AFL season; 56 years later, the franchise returned to their original home.

The season ended when the Houston Oilers defeated the San Diego Chargers in the AFL Championship game.

Division races
The AFL had 8 teams, grouped into two divisions.  Each team would play a home-and-away game against the other 7 teams in the league for a total of 14 games, and the best team in the Eastern Division would play against the best in the Western Division in a championship game.  If there was a tie in the standings at the top of either division, a one-game playoff would be held to determine the division winner.

The San Diego Chargers won their first eleven games, clinching the Western Division on November 12, with four games left.  When San Diego reached 10–0, it had twice the wins of any other team in the AFL.  In the Eastern Division, the Titans of New York lost 27–10 to Denver, while Boston beat Buffalo 52–21, in Week Seven, for a tie in the race, with the Pats at 3–3–1 and the Titans at 3–3–0.  The Titans lost, 48–13 to San Diego, in Week Nine.  The following week, though (November 12), Houston beat Boston, 27–15, to take a half-game lead, and won the division by a full game.

Regular season

Results

Standings

Playoffs

Awards
AP AFL Player of The Year: George Blanda, Houston Oilers 
UPI AFL Player of The Year: George Blanda, Houston Oilers

Stadium changes
 The relocated San Diego Chargers moved from Los Angeles Memorial Coliseum to Balboa Stadium
 The Oakland Raiders continued to play in San Francisco, playing all their home games at Candlestick Park

Coaching changes
Offseason
None

In-season
Boston Patriots: Lou Saban was fired after five games. Assistant coach Mike Holovak took over the head coaching duties.
Houston Oilers: Lou Rymkus was fired after five games. Assistant coach Wally Lemm took over the head coaching duties.
Oakland Raiders: Eddie Erdelatz was fired after two games. Marty Feldman took over.

See also
1961 NFL season

External links
Football Database

 
American Football League seasons